Aaron Zehnter (born 31 October 2004) is a German footballer who plays as a left-back for Augsburg.

Professional career
Zehnter is a youth product of Würzburger FV, Würzburger Kickers, and Augsburg. On 8 May 2022, he signed his first professional contract with Augsburg until 2024 with an option to extend for 2 more seasons. He made He made his league debut with the Augsburg side in a 1–0 Bundesliga win over Bayer 04 Leverkusen on 3 February 2023.

International career
Zehnter is a youth international for Germany, having played up to the Germany U19s.

References

External links
 
 
 
 

2004 births
Living people
Sportspeople from Würzburg
German footballers
Germany youth international footballers
FC Augsburg players
FC Augsburg II players
Bundesliga players
Regionalliga players
Association football fullbacks